Charles Courtney Pickney Holden (August 9, 1827 – February 9, 1905) was an American politician who served as president of the Cook County Board of Commissioners and served as the president of the Chicago Common Council. He ran unsuccessfully for mayor of Chicago in the 1871 election.

Early life
Holden was born on August 9, 1827, in Groton, New Hampshire. He was born to Phineas H. Holden and Betsy Holden. He would be one of nine children.

One of his earliest American ancestors was Richard Holden, who came to America from Ipswich, England, in 1634 with his brother Justinian on the sailing-vessel Francis, settling in what would later become Watertown, Massachusetts. Holden's maternal grandfather was Levi Parker, who served as a lieutenant in the Continental Army during the American Revolution, serving from the war's start in the Battle of Bunker Hill, until its conclusion in the Siege of Yorktown. Levi Parker was with George Washington at the time of John André's capture, and served as a guard at André's execution.

With his family, Holden moved to Chicago, Illinois, on June 30, 1836, when it was still a town of only 4,000 residents. His family soon moved to Will County, Illinois. Holden returned to Chicago at the age of 15. In Chicago, Holden first worked at a grocery store owned by Charles Sweet on Water Street.

Beginning in the spring of 1847, Holden served in the Fifth Regiment of Illinois Volunteers in the Mexican–American War until being mustered out of service in Alton, Illinois, on October 16, 1848.

Brief post-war return to Chicago
After the war, he returned to Chicago and worked at the A. H. & C. Burley bookstore on Lake Street from October 16, 1848, until March 1850.

California Gold Rush
On March 19, 1850, he joined a party traveling overland from Fort Kearny, Missouri, to California. This was amid the California Gold Rush. Holden lived in California for four years before returning to Chicago in 1854. His group reached Hangtown, California, on July 12, 1850, where they began mining the middle fork of the American River. After spending two seasons mining the river (the second season being spent at Coloma Bar), in the autumn of 1851 Holden started farming and raising livestock in the Napa Valley. He continued until December 1, 1853, at which point he began his travels back east.

Return to Chicago
On December 1, 1853, Holden began his journey back East on the SS Winfield Scott, which was headed towards Panama. However, on the first night of his voyage, the ship crashed into Anacapa Island and sunk. He and other passengers subsequently traveled across the Panama isthmus, and were ultimately taken to New York by the Pacific Mail steamer Illinois, landing January 3, 1854. Holden returned to Chicago on March 18, 1854.

Private-sector career in Chicago
In 1855, he began working as an examiner of lands for the Illinois Central Railroad, a job he would keep for 18 years. He would leave the job in February 1873. He had, during his tenure, helped to sell two million acres of their land.

Holden made a number of successful real estate investments, erecting several commercial blocks. In 1872, Holden built the Holden Block, a commercial block which survives to this day.

After leaving the Illinois Central Railroad's employ, he took a notable role in building the Chicago and Illinois River Railroad.

Political career
Holden became politically active in 1858, when he served as a delegate from Chicago to the Republican State Convention in Springfield, Illinois.

In 1872, he was a nominee to serve as a presidential elector from Illinois if Horace Greeley had carried the state.

Chicago City Council
From 1861 until 1872, Holden served as a Chicago alderman. From 1861 to 1863, he served as an alderman from the 5rd ward. From 1863 until 1872, he served as an alderman from the 10th ward.

Amid his tenure as an alderman, the city saw many milestones, including the establishment of a new water system, the start of construction on a lake tunnel for its water supply, and the Great Chicago Fire.

Amid the American Civil War, he introduced a number of patriotic resolutions that would indicate the city's support of the national government's leadership in the war. He also led the bloc of Republican aldermen to stand in opposition to the Democratic faction of the city government, which was led by mayor Francis Cornwall Sherman and alderman John Comiskey. He was Republican floor leader of the Chicago Common Council at this time.

When a military draft was ordered in case the quota of troops Chicago was required to furnish through volunteers was not met, he decided his ward, the 10th, should not have a draft. He organized a "Ward Draft Association", and was selected as its president. They then worked to raise $51,912 to pay volunteers to the war.

On the occasion that assassinated president Abraham Lincoln's remains visited Chicago as part of his funeral, Holden was the marshal of the City Council for their reception in the city. He also had introduced resolutions that the Common Council adopted relating to Lincoln's funeral.

After the Great Chicago Fire, Holden, who by this time was president of the Chicago Common Council, helped lead the city's reconstruction and helped conduct an investigation to determine when the fire reached different areas of the city.

He served as chairman of the committee named to secure the attendance of General Ulysses S. Grant at Dearborn Park in July 1865.

Additionally, as an alderman he was an advocate for a number of infrastructure projects. He was a proponent of improving the city's roads. He also was an advocate for the provision of clean water to all residents within the city, and was a key proponent who helped to get a second intake tunnel built under Lake Michigan to collect water. 

In the 1871 Chicago mayoral election, Holden was the nominee of both the Republican and Democratic parties for mayor. He lost in a landslide to Joseph Medill, however. The election was held only a month after the Great Chicago Fire.

In 1872, Holden retired from the Chicago Common Council. He would continue to serve in government for years to come, however, on the Cook County Board of Commissioners and the West Park Board of Commissioners.

West Park Board of Commissioners
From 1869 until 1878 he served on the West Park Board of Commissioners, helping to build up the West Side of Chicago's parks and boulevards system. 

He had been appointed in March 1869 by Illinois governor John M. Palmer in March 1869, and re-appointed by him in 1871. He resigned from the board in 1878.

Cook County Board of Commissioners
In 1874, he was elected to the Cook County Board of Commissioners. At this time, Holden had briefly joined the Democratic Party as a member of the local "People's Party" sect.

From 1876 to 1877, Holden was the first president of the Cook County Board of Commissioners. While he was again a Republican, many were untrusting at this time of Holden's loyalty to the Republican Party.

Death
Holden died on February 9, 1905, in Matteson, Illinois, where he was spending the winter. He had been sick for several weeks with pneumonia and "weakness of the heart". At the time he died, he lived in Chicago at 1387 West Monroe Street.

Personal life

On September 17, 1855, Holden married Sarah J. Reynolds, the daughter of Isaac N. Reynolds and Ruth Ann Reynolds. She was the granddaughter of Abraham Holderman, the namesake of Holderman's Grove, Illinois. 

During the Civil War, he raised a company for the Eighty-eighth Regiment of the Illinois Volunteers, which his brother Levi P. Holden led. 

Holden was widowed on July 26, 1873.

On July 11, 1888, he married Thelma N. McCoy, daughter of Henry M. McCoy.

He had an adopted daughter named Sarah.

Holden was a member of the Illinois State Association of Veterans of the Mexican War, the Sons of the American Revolution, California Pioneers' Association of Chicago, Old Settlers' Society of Cook County, and the German Old Settler's Association (which gave him a gold medal in 1888).

Holden's extended family had numerous members who were well-involved in Chicago politics. This included Charles N. Holden, his cousin.

References

Chicago City Council members
1827 births
1905 deaths
People from New Hampshire
Presidents of the Cook County Board of Commissioners
Illinois Republicans
American military personnel of the Mexican–American War
Deaths from pneumonia in Illinois
People of the California Gold Rush